Laomedea is a genus of Cnidaria of the family Leptothecata. The genus was described by Lamouroux in 1812.

References

Campanulariidae
Hydrozoan genera